Yareba, or Middle Musa, is a language of Papua New Guinea.

Phonology 

Yareba phonology:

Yareba allows for the diphthongs ai, au, oi, ou, ei, ei, ui, ua, ue.

External links 
 Paradisec has the Tom Dutton collection (TD1) that includes Yareba language materials.

References

Languages of Papua New Guinea
Yareban languages